Lee Jung-keun (born 29 July 1960) is a Korean former wrestler who competed in the 1984 Summer Olympics.

References

External links
 

1960 births
Living people
South Korean male sport wrestlers
Olympic wrestlers of South Korea
Olympic medalists in wrestling
Olympic bronze medalists for South Korea
Wrestlers at the 1984 Summer Olympics
Asian Games medalists in wrestling
Asian Games gold medalists for South Korea
Asian Games silver medalists for South Korea
Wrestlers at the 1982 Asian Games
Wrestlers at the 1986 Asian Games
Medalists at the 1984 Summer Olympics
Medalists at the 1982 Asian Games
Medalists at the 1986 Asian Games
20th-century South Korean people
21st-century South Korean people